Mt. Zion Missionary Baptist Church, also known as the Enola Baptist Church, is a historic church at 249 AR 107 in Enola, Arkansas. It is a single-story masonry structure, built out of local fieldstone with cream-colored brick trim.  The main block has a gabled roof, with a projecting vestibule and entrance sheltered by a gabled roof.  A cross-gabled rear section projects slightly to the sides.  The church was built about 1952, with the exterior stone veneer work done by Silas Owens, Sr., a locally renowned master mason, with the rear addition finished by his son, Silas Jr.

The building was listed on the National Register of Historic Places in 2009.

See also
National Register of Historic Places listings in Faulkner County, Arkansas

References

Baptist churches in Arkansas
Churches on the National Register of Historic Places in Arkansas
Churches completed in 1952
Churches in Faulkner County, Arkansas
National Register of Historic Places in Faulkner County, Arkansas